The 2014 Chinese Figure Skating Championships was held between December 28 and 29, 2013 in Changchun. Medals were awarded in the disciplines of men's singles, ladies' singles, pair skating, and ice dancing.

Results

Men

Ladies

Pairs

Ice dance

External links
 2014 Chinese Championships results

Chinese Figure Skating Championships
2013 in figure skating
Chinese Figure Skating Championships, 2014
Sport in Changchun